Heliothela didymospila is a moth of the family Crambidae. It was described by Turner in 1915. It is found in Australia, where it has been recorded from Queensland.

References

Moths described in 1915
Heliothelini